The Bay Conference is a high school athletics conference made up of eight teams in northeastern Wisconsin, centering primarily around the Green Bay and Fox Valley metropolitan areas. Conference schools are members of the Wisconsin Interscholastic Athletic Association.

Conference history

1970–2007 
The Bay Conference was established in 1970 by charter members Ashwaubenon, Bay Port, Clintonville, De Pere, Marinette, Oconto, Oconto Falls, Pulaski, Seymour, and West De Pere. 1979 brought the addition of former East Central Conference member New London and former Wisconsin Valley Conference member Shawano, in exchange for Oconto and Oconto Falls, who would go to the Central Wisconsin Conference. In 1999, Clintonville left the Bay Conference to join the newly formed Valley 8 Conference. Of the ten original members, only Seymour, and West De Pere have remained in the conference since its inception.

2007–2015 
The 2007 WIAA realignment brought major changes to the Bay Conference. Ashwaubenon, Bay Port, De Pere, and Pulaski transferred to the Fox River Classic Conference (FRCC), where they joined the larger Green Bay, Manitowoc, and Sheboygan area high schools. Hortonville and Oconto Falls transferred from the now defunct Valley 8 Conference, and Denmark and Luxemburg-Casco transferred from the Packerland Conference. Each of these schools had increasing enrollments and had outgrown their previous conferences.

In late 2008, Hortonville petitioned the WIAA to move the growing school into the Fox Valley Association in exchange for Menasha High School, whose declining enrollment prompted them to look at other alternatives. Hortonville cited travel times and costs as well as the imbalance that existed in the Bay Conference as reasons to leave. Hortonville's enrollment was nearly twice as large as the Bay Conference's smallest school and 200 students more than the second largest school. The issue came to a vote at a Menasha School Board meeting, which resulted in Menasha's decision to remain in the FVA. In September 2011, at an WIAA area meeting held in Appleton, Green Bay West requested to leave the FRCC to join the Bay Conference, and Green Bay East asked to go if needed. West and East both cited their inability to compete in the FRCC. In a September 2012 WIAA area meeting, New London asked to leave the Bay Conference to move to the Eastern Valley Conference, and Denmark requested to leave. Green Bay East and West are still seeking to move. At a WIAA Board of Control meeting in September, the board gave first approval to swap Hortonville with FVA member Menasha before the 2014-15 school year. A final vote was taken after the 40-day appeal window and passed. In December 2013, the WIAA Board of Control gave first approval for the departure of Denmark, Luxemburg–Casco, Marinette and Oconto Falls to the Eastern Valley in Return for the FRCC's Green Bay East & West and the EVC's Xavier. Waupaca would be in the Bay for football only. A final vote was taken after the 40-day appeal window & successfully passed for implementation for the 2015–2016 school year along with several other conference realignments.

2015–present
Starting in 2015, the conference stayed steady at eight schools. However, in September 2016, West De Pere requested to move to the FRCC, citing inadequate athletic competition in the Bay and a school size that was rapidly growing. Other reasons included rivalries against teams in the FRCC like De Pere, Ashwaubenon and Pulaski. In December 2019, as part of the realignment process, West De Pere formally filed a request to move to the FRCC. After a committee reviewed the process, West De Pere's request was denied due to their failure to provide documents showing discussions with the Northeastern Conference which was provided as a solution to fill the void leaving the Bay Conference. West De Pere chose not to appeal the rejection.

In 2018, the WIAA and Wisconsin Football Coaches Association released a realignment plan to go into effect starting in fall 2020 for football only. The proposal has Green Bay West, Green Bay East, West De Pere, and Menasha moving to the FRCC, with Fox Valley Lutheran and Marinette joining the five other remaining Bay football schools in a revamped Bay where Shawano would be the largest school in terms of enrollment. After some modifications the final Bay Conference will consist of current schools New London, Seymour, Shawano, Waupaca and Xavier, as well as football-only schools Fox Valley Lutheran and Winneconne.

Membership

Current members

Affiliate members

Former members

References

External links
 

Wisconsin high school sports conferences
1970 establishments in Wisconsin